Spyridium parvifolium, commonly known dusty miller, is a flowering plant in the family Rhamnaceae. It has dark green leaves and clusters of small, whitish flowers at the end of branches. It is widespread in eastern states of Australia.

Description
The upper surface usually veined, densely covered with long, erect, rigid hairs to densely covered with short, soft, upright hairs. The lower surface thickly covered with whitish star-shaped hairs, sometimes simple, rusty hairs over the veins, margins flat to curved under, occasionally scalloped. The flowers are in small heads, whitish, woolly, and borne in leafy clusters in leaf axils at the end of branches.

Taxonomy and naming
Spyridium parvifolium was first formally described in 1862 by Ferdinand von Mueller and the description was published in Fragmenta Phytographiae Australiae. The specific epithet (parvifolium) means "small leaved".

Distribution and habitat
Dusty miller grows on the tablelands and slopes in New South Wales south of Burrinjuck Dam and on the coast south of Twofold Bay. It also grows in Victoria, Tasmania and South Australia.

Cultivation
Spyridium parvifolium has a degree of frost and drought tolerance, and adapts well to most soils and positions with adequate drainage. A prostrate form with the cultivar name 'Austraflora Nimbus', spreads to 1 metre across and is suited to coastal gardens, rockeries and containers.

References

parvifolium
Rosales of Australia
Flora of New South Wales
Flora of South Australia
Flora of Tasmania
Flora of Victoria (Australia)
Taxa named by William Jackson Hooker